Theater Company of Boston (TCB) was co-founded by David Wheeler and Naomi Thornton  in 1963. Wheeler served as its artistic director until its closure in 1975. Actors including Al Pacino, Robert DeNiro, Dustin Hoffman, Robert Duvall, Jon Voight, Stockard Channing, James Woods, Blythe Danner, Larry Bryggman, John Cazale, Hector Elizondo, Spalding Gray, Paul Guilfoyle, Ralph Waite, Charles Siebert and Paul Benedict were part of the company. Following Wheeler's death, Pacino described him as "one of the lights of my life".

References 

1963 establishments in Massachusetts
Organizations disestablished in 1975
Arts organizations established in 1963
Theatre companies in Boston